Isopogon robustus, commonly known as robust coneflower, is a plant in the family Proteaceae and is endemic to a restricted area in the southwest of Western Australia. It is a shrub with cylindrical leaves and oval heads of pink flowers.

Description

Taxonomy and naming
Isopogon robustus was first formally described in 2005 by Neil Gibson in the journal Muelleria from a manuscript prepared by Donald Bruce Foreman but not published before his death. The specific epithet (robustus) is a reference to the thick leaves and large flowers of this isopogon.

Distribution and habitat
This isopogon grows on laterite but is only known from a population of about 120 plants in the Parker Range near Southern Cross in the south-west of Western Australia.

Conservation status
Isopogon robustus is listed as "critically endangered" under the Australian Government Environment Protection and Biodiversity Conservation Act 1999 and as "Threatened Flora (Declared Rare Flora — Extant)" by the Department of Environment and Conservation (Western Australia).

References

robustus
Eudicots of Western Australia
Plants described in 2005